The Others is a 2001 English-language Spanish gothic supernatural psychological horror film written, directed, and scored by Alejandro Amenábar. It stars Nicole Kidman, Fionnula Flanagan, Christopher Eccleston, Elaine Cassidy, Eric Sykes, Alakina Mann and James Bentley.

The Others was theatrically released in the United States on August 2, 2001, by Dimension Films and in Spain on September 7, 2001, by Warner Sogefilms. The film was a box-office success, grossing over $209.9 million worldwide and received positive reviews from critics, with many praising Amenábar's direction and screenplay, as well as the musical score, atmosphere and Kidman's performance.

The film won eight Goya Awards, including awards for Best Film and Best Director. This was the first English-language film ever to receive the Best Film Award at the Goyas (Spain's national film awards), without a single word of Spanish spoken in it. The Others was nominated for six Saturn Awards including Best Director and Best Writing for Amenábar and Best Performance by a Younger Actor for Alakina Mann, and won three: Best Horror Film, Best Actress for Kidman and Best Supporting Actress for Fionnula Flanagan. Kidman was also nominated for a Golden Globe Award for Best Actress in Drama and a BAFTA Award for Best Actress in a Leading Role, with Amenábar being nominated for a BAFTA Award for Best Original Screenplay, a rare occurrence for a horror film.

Plot
In 1945, Grace Stewart awakens one day from a nightmare in the immediate aftermath of World War II. She lives in a remote country house in Jersey, a Channel Island formerly occupied by the Germans. She is with her two young children, Anne and Nicholas, who have an unspecified disease characterized by photosensitivity. Grace hires three new servants— housekeeper Mrs. Bertha Mills, gardener Edmund Tuttle, and a mute girl named Lydia. Mrs. Mills explains to Grace that she worked in the same house many years before. When odd events occur at the house, Grace begins to fear there are unknown "others" present. Anne claims to have seen a group of people in the house several times: a man, a woman, an old woman, and a child called Victor, who claimed that "the house is theirs". After Grace hears footsteps and unknown voices, she orders the house to be searched. She then finds a 19th-century photo album containing photographs of corpses. When Grace asks Mrs. Mills about her previous experience in the house, Mrs. Mills recounts that many left due to an outbreak of tuberculosis.

At night, Grace witnesses a piano playing itself and becomes convinced that the house is haunted. She runs outside in search of the local priest to bless the house. Before leaving, Grace instructs Tuttle to check a small nearby cemetery to see if a family has been buried there with a little boy named Victor. Tuttle finds the cemetery but covers the gravestones with leaves at the order of Mrs. Mills who assures him that Grace will learn the reasons behind the unexplained events in due time. Outside, Grace runs into her husband Charles, who she thought had been killed in the war. Charles greets his children after a long absence, but is distant during his short stay at the house. Later, Grace checks up on her daughter, Anne, whom she has left to play in a spare room.  Instead, to her horror Grace finds an old woman on the floor in the room wearing her daughter's communion dress, veil down. The old woman claims in Anne's voice "I am your daughter". Frightened, Grace attacks the old woman only to find that the old woman is merely an illusion and Grace has inadvertently attacked her own daughter. Later, Anne tells her brother that their mother has gone mad in the same way she did "that day" but he does not recall. Charles says he must leave for the front, even though Grace claims that the war is over. The two embrace and lie motionless together in bed.

The next morning, Charles has left and the children are screaming that the curtains are gone, thus letting in the sunlight. Grace accuses the servants of having removed the curtains against her wishes and expels them from the house. That night, the children sneak outside and discover that the headstones in the cemetery belong to the recently banished servants. The children run away in fear when they turn to see that the servants are approaching them toward the cemetery in the foggy dark of night. Meanwhile, Grace finds a photograph that has slipped out of the Book of the Dead and fallen onto the floor under some furniture. The photograph displays the corpses of the three servants, Mrs. Mills, Tuttle and Lydia, who perished during a tuberculosis outbreak in 1891. The children run upstairs and hide in the bedroom where they are discovered by "the other" elderly woman. Mrs. Mills returns to the house and tells Grace to go upstairs and talk to the intruders.

Grace discovers that the old woman is in fact a medium in a séance with Victor's parents, who has found out via automatic writing that Grace smothered her children to death with a pillow in a fit of despair before committing suicide. Grace realizes that "the others" are the family that has moved into the house, and that she, her children, and the servants are, in fact, dead.

Following this display of supernatural and spiritual activity, Victor and his family vacate the house and leave it in the occupancy of the ghosts of its predecessors. However, because they are dead, Anne and Nicholas' ghosts are finally allowed to play in the sun. Mrs. Mills informs the Stewarts that others will come back to the house and they will have to learn to coexist together, but Grace ominously states that the house is theirs. As she says this, a "For Sale" sign is seen mounted to the gate.

Cast

Production
The production crew visited Penshurst Place in Kent to film at the Lime Walk in the gardens. The Lime Walk was used in the scene where Grace Stewart (Nicole Kidman) went looking for a priest in the thick fog and instead met her husband who had returned from the war. Filming locations are, among other spots, Palacio de los Hornillos in Las Fraguas, Cantabria, Northern Spain, and in Madrid.

Reception

Box office
The Others was released on August 10, 2001 in 1,678 theaters in the United States and Canada and grossed $14 million its opening weekend, ranking fourth at the box office behind American Pie 2, Rush Hour 2 and The Princess Diaries. It stayed in fourth place for three more weeks, expanding to more theaters. During the weekend of September 21–23, it was second at the box office, grossing $5 million in 2,801 theaters. The film, which cost $17 million to produce, eventually grossed $96.5 million in the United States and Canada. It grossed $24 million in Spain, becoming the highest-grossing Spanish film of all-time, beating the record set earlier in the year by Torrente 2: Misión en Marbella. It grossed $89 million in other countries, for a worldwide total gross of $209.9 million.

Critical reception
Many critics praised the performances of the stars; especially Nicole Kidman as Grace Stewart. On the review aggregator Rotten Tomatoes, the film has an 83% approval rating based on 162 reviews, with an average rating of 7.2/10. The website's consensus reads: "The Others is a spooky thriller that reminds us that a movie doesn't need expensive special effects to be creepy". On Metacritic, the film had an average score of 74 out of 100, based on 29 reviews. Roger Ebert gave the film two and a half stars out of four, praising that "...Alejandro Amenábar has the patience to create a languorous, dreamy atmosphere, and Nicole Kidman succeeds in convincing us that she is a normal person in a disturbing situation and not just a standard-issue horror movie hysteric". However, he noted that "in drawing out his effects, Amenábar is a little too confident that style can substitute for substance".

Although the film deals primarily with the spiritual interaction of ghosts with each other rather than with living humans, William Skidelsky of The Observer has suggested that it was inspired by the 1898 novella The Turn of the Screw written by Henry James.

Accolades
 Goya Awards:
 Best Cinematography (Javier Aguirresarobe)
 Best Director (Alejandro Amenábar)
 Best Editing (Nacho Ruiz Capillas)
 Best Film
 Best Production Design
 Best Production Supervision
 Best Original Screenplay (Alejandro Amenábar)
 Best Sound
 Kansas City Film Critics Circle Awards:
 Best Actress (Nicole Kidman)
 London Film Critics:
 Best Actress of the Year (Nicole Kidman)
 Online Film Critics:
 Best Actress (Nicole Kidman)
 Best Original Screenplay (Alejandro Amenábar)
 Saturn Awards:
 Best Actress (Nicole Kidman)
Best Supporting Actress (Fionnula Flanagan)
 Best Horror Film

Planned remake
In April 2020, Sentient Entertainment had acquired the remake rights to the film. The company plans to revamp the film by setting it in the present day. Later that year, it was announced that Universal Pictures will co-produce and distribute the film with Sentient.

In media
 Scary Movie 3 includes parodies of scenes from the film, particularly the famous "I am your daughter" sequence.
 Hum Kaun Hai and Anjaane: The Unknown are Hindi remakes of The Others.
 Spanish Movie is a parody film that spoofs several successful Spanish horror/drama films, primarily The Others but also The Orphanage, Pan's Labyrinth, REC, and others.
 Australian Band Elora Danan wrote a song about the film called "Thank God for Their Growth in Faith and Love" (a line seen on the children's blackboard in a later scene) which was a track on their debut EP We All Have Secrets.
 Electronic music artist Venetian Snares uses a sample from the film in the song "Children's Limbo" on the album Find Candace.
 Simpsons Treehouse of Horror XXV includes a segment spoofing the film in which the Simpsons are haunted by their former selves from The Tracey Ullman Show.

See also 
 List of Spanish films of 2001
 List of ghost films
 The Turn of the Screw
''The Innocents (1961 film)

References

External links
 
 
 
 

2001 films
English-language Spanish films
2000s French-language films
2001 horror films
2000s thriller films
2000s ghost films
Supernatural thriller films
Spanish supernatural horror films
Supernatural drama films
Spanish horror films
Best Film Goya Award winners
Filicide in fiction
Films about children
Films about families
Films about siblings
Films directed by Alejandro Amenábar
Films set in country houses
Films set in the Channel Islands
Jersey in fiction
Films set in the 1940s
Films shot in Madrid
Films shot in Spain
Gothic horror films
Spanish haunted house films
Murder–suicide in films
Period horror films
Cruise/Wagner Productions films
Dimension Films films
Spanish ghost films
Films about the afterlife
Sogecine films
2000s English-language films
2000s Spanish films